Moritz Sprenger (born 22 February 1995) is a retired German professional footballer who played as a defender for VfL Wolfsburg II.

Sprenger was born in Magdeburg, but started playing football in Gifhorn, Lower Saxony. He moved to VfL Wolfsburg at age 12, eventually joining their reserve squad in 2014. After playing in 38 league matches and winning the Regionalliga Nord in 2016, Sprenger also played in the promotion play-offs. However, Wolfsburg lost to Jahn Regensburg and remained in the Regionalliga.

For the next season, Sprenger joined 1. FC Magdeburg in the 3. Liga on loan. He made his professional league debut in a 0–3 loss to SC Fortuna Köln.

Honours

Club 

 VfL Wolfsburg
 Regionalliga Nord: 2016

References 

German footballers
Footballers from Saxony-Anhalt
1995 births
Living people
Sportspeople from Magdeburg
Association football defenders
VfL Wolfsburg II players
1. FC Magdeburg players
3. Liga players